Hope Gordon (born 4 November 1994) is a British paracanoeist and a para Nordic skier. She competed at the 2022 Winter Paralympics becoming Great Britain's first ever female para Nordic skier. She is a three-time World silver medalist in paracanoe.

Disability
Gordon had her left leg amputated above the knee in 2016 following her diagnosis of complex regional pain syndrome four years earlier. She started Paralympic swimming after recovering from her operation, she had missed out a place to compete at the 2018 Commonwealth Games, she switched to paracanoe after seeing a canoeing advert looking for talented athletes and was encouraged by Paralympic swimmer Charlotte Henshaw who was also a swimmer turned paracanoeist. She finished fourth in her debut competition in Poznań at the 2019 Paracanoe European Championships, she won her first medals at the 2021 ICF Canoe Sprint World Championships by winning two silver medals in both the kayak and canoe events.

Gordon made her debut Paralympic appearance at the 2022 Winter Paralympics, she finished 16th in the middle distance and 17th in the sprint cross country. She described the snowy conditions as 'mashed tatties' at Zhangjiakou where the skiing event was held.

References

1994 births
Living people
People from Golspie
Sportspeople from Highland (council area)
Paralympic cross-country skiers of Great Britain
Paracanoeists of Great Britain
Scottish female cross-country skiers
Scottish female canoeists
Cross-country skiers at the 2022 Winter Paralympics
Alumni of Edinburgh Napier University